Søren Bo Søndergaard (born 16 August 1955 in Kyndby) is a Danish teacher, metalworker and politician, who is a member of the Folketing for the Red-Green Alliance. He was elected into parliament at the 2015 Danish general election, and previously served from 1994 to 2005. He was a Member of the European Parliament for the People's Movement against the EU and associated member of GUE/NGL from 2007 to 2014.

Political career
Søndergaard was first elected into the Folketing at the 1994 election and was reelected in 1998 and 2001. From 2006 to 2007 he was a municipal council member of Gladsaxe Municipality. From 2007 to 2014 he was a member of the European Parliament. After the 2014 European Parliament election he failed to get reelected. In 2015 he ran for national parliament again and was elected. He was reelected in 2019.

References

External links
 Official homepage
EU Parliament profile
 Biography on the website of the Danish Parliament (Folketinget)

1955 births
Living people
Frederikssund Municipality
Danish municipal councillors
People's Movement against the EU MEPs
Red–Green Alliance (Denmark) politicians
MEPs for Denmark 2009–2014
MEPs for Denmark 2004–2009
Members of the Folketing 1994–1998
Members of the Folketing 1998–2001
Members of the Folketing 2001–2005
Members of the Folketing 2015–2019
Members of the Folketing 2019–2022
Members of the Folketing 2022–2026